Driss Sekkat is an international award-winning executive producer and programming launch expert. 

Sekkat has served as creator and executive producer on various TV and web series in the United States and around the world. 

Sekkat founded All Access Media in 2016, a production company specialized in the launch of original programming across TV, OTT, digital, and social platforms. 

In 2018, Sekkat helped create and launch the first financial Over-The-Top (OTT) network of its kind, TD Ameritrade Network. As executive producer, Sekkat led the network’s launch of 8 hours of original programming.

In 2016, Sekkat was executive producer and creator of a 3 part hard-hitting documentary series on violent extremism entitled Invisible Enemy, filmed in Morocco.

Sekkat created four seasons of the investigative documentary Street Pulse . The flagship series won the 2015 Bronze Award at the New York Film Festival for its series on Cemetery Residents and was awarded the 2014 CINE Special Jury Award and the 2013 CINE Golden Eagle Award for its exclusive one hour documentary on El Minya quarry labor workers. The hit show was nominated in 2013 by the AIB International Media Excellence Awards for best documentary series.

In 2014 – 2015, Sekkat created and produced 2 seasons of Our Neighborhood – an 8 part docu-series on life inside Cairo’s neighborhoods.

His most notable experience includes his special coverage of President Obama’s visit to Cairo in 2009 and the 2012 U.S. elections.

Sekkat was presented with the 2016 Ohio Wesleyan University Young Alumni Award, where he earned a Bachelor of Arts degree in Journalism.

References

Year of birth missing (living people)
Living people
Moroccan television people
Ohio Wesleyan University alumni